The Memphite Tomb of Horemheb is located in the Saqqara necropolis, near Memphis, Egypt. It was constructed before Horemheb ascended to the throne and was never used for his burial, since he later built the Theban tomb KV57 for this purpose. His two wives Mutnedjmet and Amenia were buried within the structure.

The tomb was discovered by art robbers at the beginning of the 19th century. Looted reliefs were acquired by a number of European and American museums. The tomb's location was then lost, it was relocated in 1975 and excavated in 1979.

The tomb was built in three phases, as Horemheb's status rose. The first design consisted of an entry pylon into forecourt, a colonnaded court containing the burial shaft and three chapels or offering rooms. Intrusive burials were found in the side chapels. The forecourt was then walled to produce two small chapels, one at each side. They were entered by two new piercings through the pylon. A new walled forecourt was constructed in front of the pylon. To make this extension a 5th–6th Dynasty mastaba was demolished and the burial shaft with a burial chamber some 17m below incorporated into the new forecourt. Burials from the 19th Dynasty were found at 9m depth. Finally the forecourt was closed by a pylon some 7m high and colonnaded to form the first peristyle open court. The narrowed original forecourt was covered with a vaulted roof and contained statues while the chapels became storage rooms.

Military scenes were carved on the original peristyle court and scenes showing Horemheb's duties in office on the walls of the later, first peristyle open court including one where he deputised for Tutankhamun on the north wall. On the North wall are scenes from the funeral, showing kiosks with smash pots and mourners. Only the lowest register is well preserved. From the next register above only the legs of horses and the wheels of chariots are visible. On the east wall, on the north side are shown houses. The wall is in general only badly preserved.

Careful inspection shows that the uraei were added to the images after Horemheb became Pharaoh.

Notes and references

References

Bibliography

 
 
 

Horemheb
Saqqara
Tombs of ancient Egypt